is a Japanese footballer currently playing as a forward for Matsumoto Yamaga. He will join Sagan Tosu in January 2023.

Career statistics

Club
.

Notes

References

External links

2003 births
Living people
Sportspeople from Tokyo Metropolis
Association football people from Tokyo Metropolis
Japanese footballers
Association football forwards
J2 League players
Matsumoto Yamaga FC players